Tropical Storm Beatriz was a short-lived tropical storm that made landfall in the Mexican state of Oaxaca in June 2017. The second named storm of the 2017 Pacific hurricane season, Beatriz developed from a tropical wave which had exited the coast of West Africa on May 18 and crossed Central America, and was designated as Tropical Depression Two-E on May 31. Shortly after being upgraded to a tropical storm, Beatriz made landfall near Puerto Angel, Mexico on the evening of June 1. It subsequently weakened into a tropical depression as it moved ashore, dissipating quickly afterwards.

Heavy rainfall from Beatriz caused flash flooding and mudslides in portions of Southwestern Mexico, resulting in seven fatalities. Along its path, Beatriz caused MXN$3.2 billion (US$172 million) in damage.

Meteorological history

The origins of Beatriz was first traced to a tropical wave which exited the coast of West Africa on May 18. The wave moved westward through the Atlantic and Caribbean with minimal convection, though convection increased when the wave moved into the Eastern Pacific Ocean from Central America through May 25 and 26. Over the next few days, the circulation of the low remained elongated, but favorable conditions allowed the system to develop organized convection. The depression moved slowly northeastward embedded within an area of deep southwesterly flow around a large mid to upper-level trough. Beatriz reached its peak intensity with maximum sustained winds of 45 mph (75 km/h) and a minimum barometric pressure of 1002 mbar (hPa; 29.59 inHg) shortly before making landfall west of Puerto Angel that evening. Beatriz weakened to a tropical depression by 06:00 UTC on June 2 and quickly dissipated over the mountainous terrain of Mexico. The remnants of Beatriz still maintained some convection and moved into the Gulf of Mexico where they failed to redevelop due to strong wind shear.

Preparations and impact

In preparation for Beatriz, the government of Mexico issued a Tropical Storm Watch and eventually Warning from Salina Cruz to Puerto Escondido in Oaxaca. The warning was discontinued by 06:00 UTC on June 2 as Beatriz moved inland. In Oaxaca, schools were closed until June 3 and flights out of Bahías de Huatulco International Airport were cancelled.

According to local officials, Beatriz was responsible for six fatalities including two children and four women who were killed in mudslides in Oaxaca. News reports indicated that hundreds of mudslides occurred across Southwestern Mexico leaving dozens of roads impassible including sections of Federal Highway 200. A portion of the Oaxaca-Tehuantepec Highway was washed away and a bridge on the highway received some damage. Several rivers across the region overflowed their banks which affected homes in numerous communities. However, the rainfall brought much needed drought relief to the region filling a local reservoir to 70% capacity for the first time in two years.

See also

Other storms with the same name
Weather of 2017
Tropical cyclones in 2017
List of Eastern Pacific tropical storms
Tropical Storm Barbara (2007) – affected the same area as Beatriz.
Tropical Depression Twelve-E (2011) – affected similar areas with disastrous effects.
Hurricane Barbara (2013) – made landfall in roughly the same area.

References

External links

2017 Pacific hurricane season
Eastern Pacific tropical storms
June 2017 events in Mexico
Tropical cyclones in 2017
Hurricanes in Oaxaca